Jane Ballard Dyer is an American politician. In 2008 and 2010 she ran unsuccessfully for the 3rd congressional district seat in South Carolina as the nominee of the Democratic Party and Working Families Party. She has been a commercial pilot since 1988, and was a United States Air Force pilot.

Early life, education and career
Jane Ballard Dyer was born November 11, 1957, in Greenville, South Carolina, and grew up in nearby Pickens County, South Carolina, the sixth of eight children. After graduating from Easley High School, Dyer attended Clemson University. She received her degree in mechanical engineering (1981) and was commissioned an officer through Air Force ROTC. She was the first Clemson woman to attend Air Force Pilot Training.  She served in the USAF 1981–1988.

Dyer earned her pilot wings, was a KC-135 Air Refueling Pilot, and a T-37 Instructor Pilot. Her husband John is a highly decorated USAF fighter pilot, among his medals are a Purple Heart and 7 Flying Crosses. They returned to South Carolina in 1988 and Dyer worked as a pilot at FedEx for the past 20 years, currently flying as an A300 Captain.

The Dyers have four children and three grandchildren. He flew corporate jets for Michelin until he retired.

Political career

2008 Congressional campaign

Dyer ran for the Third Congressional District seat of South Carolina in 2008. She lost to incumbent Republican Congressman J. Gresham Barrett with 35% of the vote.

2010 Congressional campaign

Dyer announced her candidacy for the Third Congressional District seat in January 2010. Incumbent Congressman J. Gresham Barrett ran for Governor of South Carolina, leaving an open seat. She won the June 8 Democratic primary 65%-35% over Brian Doyle. Dyer campaigned on creating clean-tech jobs, improving public education, and supporting military veterans.  She lost the general election to Jeff Duncan 62%–36%; she spent $272,698 and he spent $935,503.

References

Jane Dyer Announces for Congress GreenvilleOnline.com. Retrieved 2010-01-21.
Jane Dyer Democratic Candidate FoxNews.com. Retrieved 2010-02-08.
Clyburn Stumps for Dyer in Oconee County Independentmail.com. Retrieved 2008-10-30.
Dyer Campaign Takes off for 3rd Congressional District Seat in South Carolina Independentmail.com. Retrieved 2008-03-26.
McCain wins South Carolina; Lindsey Graham re-elected to Senate USAToday.com. Retrieved 2008-11-05.
Sample Ballot for Nov. Election EdgefieldDaily.com. Retrieved 2008-10-15.

External links
Jane Dyer for Congress official campaign site 
 
Campaign contributions from OpenSecrets.org
SC Democratic Party

Living people
1957 births
Clemson University alumni
South Carolina Democrats
United States Air Force officers
Aviators from South Carolina
FedEx people
Baptists from South Carolina
Women in the United States Air Force
Commercial aviators
People from Greenville, South Carolina
American women commercial aviators
21st-century American women